https://www.justice.gov/usao-dc/case-multi-defendant/file/1476356/download

Carol Kicinski is a gluten-free advocate, TV chef, magazine founder and editor-in-chief, gluten-free recipe developer, cookbook author, and food writer. She is the founder of Simply Gluten Free Omnimedia, Inc. Kicinski is also the founder and editor-in-chief of Simply Gluten Free magazine. She presents monthly episodes as a gluten-free TV chef on Daytime, a nationally syndicated morning television show produced by NBC-based WFLA-Tampa Bay. She has been gluten-free for more than 20 years. In 2018, Kicinski launched a gluten-free mineral makeup line, Beauté Minerals.

Kicinski has been charged by federal prosecutors for allegedly storming the U.S. Capitol on January 6, 2021, while wearing a blue "TRUMP" hat.  On October 27, 2022 Kicinski pled guilty to the charge of "Entering and Remaining in a Restricted Building or Grounds, in violation of 18 U.S.C. § 1752(a)(1)" and is awaiting sentencing.

Magazine editor-in-chief
In November 2012, Kicinski launched Simply Gluten Free magazine, a national lifestyle magazine for gluten and allergen-free living. The magazine is written by gluten- and allergen-free writers as well as medical doctors and professionals. The magazine is published by Edgewater Park Media, Inc., a media company based in Dunedin, Florida, owned by Simply Gluten Free Omnimedia. The magazine is distributed in the US and Canada by Ingram Content Group.

In December 2013, Simply Gluten Free magazine received the "Hottest Launches of the Year" award by Media Industry News, an industry source on consumer and business-to-business magazine business.

In 2015, the magazine began producing special collector's editions focused on specific topics, like baking and holiday favorites.

Television
In 2009, Kicinski started doing television cooking segments on the NBC-based WFLA-Tampa Bay's Daytime TV show. The show is nationally syndicated to 140 cities, including New York, Los Angeles, Chicago and Tampa, reaching 80 million households monthly.

Writings
Kicinski has written cookbooks including Simply Gluten Free Desserts (2011), Simply Gluten Free Quick Meals (2012), Simply Gluten Free Cupcakes (2013) and Simply Gluten Free 5 Ingredient Cookbook (2016).

She has also written ten eBooks. She has contributed recipes to The Cooking Light Gluten-Free Cookbook. Kicinski was a monthly recipe contributor to Martha Stewart's Whole Living from 2011 to 2013.

Blog
The website and blog, Simply Gluten Free, was Kicinski's first platform for sharing gluten-free recipes, starting in 2007. The purpose of the website is to educate, entertain and inspire those with celiac disease or sensitivity to gluten and other food allergens to live a healthier lifestyle for themselves and their families.

In 2010, Kicinski started the Gluten-free Global Community, putting more than 340 gluten-free bloggers worldwide in communication with each other. In 2012, she started the Celiac Support Groups Community with more than 280 groups represented worldwide.

Recipes
Kicinski began developing gluten-free recipes for herself and her family more than 20 years ago when she learned she was gluten sensitive. She now does recipe development for gluten-free companies. Kicinski also developed Carol's Gluten Free All Purpose Flour.

Advocacy
Kicinski attends conventions, expos, events and celiac group meetings to speak about gluten-free living. She was an educational speaker at the Southeast Natural Products Expo in December 2012. She is a presenter at gluten-free and allergen-free events.

References

External links
Simply Gluten Free – official website
Simply Gluten Free Recipes

Writers from Florida
Diet food advocates
Food writers
Gluten-free cookbook writers
Date of birth missing (living people)
Living people
Women food writers
Women cookbook writers
Year of birth missing (living people)